The Civil Rights Act of 1990 was a bill that, had it been signed into law, would have made it easier for litigants in race or sex discrimination cases to win. It was introduced into the 101st United States Congress on February 7, 1990, by Senator Edward Kennedy (D-MA) in the United States Senate, and by Augustus Hawkins (D-CA) in the House of Representatives. While making its way through Congress, the bill was considered to be civil rights groups' #1 legislative priority. Soon before the bill made it to the desk of then-President of the United States George H. W. Bush, it was criticized by the Harvard Law School professor Charles Fried. In a New York Times op-ed, Fried wrote that descriptions of the bill as the most important civil rights legislation in a quarter-century were "a public relations flimflam perpetrated by a cabal of overzealous civil rights plaintiffs' lawyers." He concluded by saying that Bush should "veto this bill in its present form."

On October 22, 1990, President Bush vetoed the bill, claiming that it "employs a maze of highly legalistic language to introduce the destructive force of quotas into our national employment system." The Bush administration argued that the bill's provisions were strict enough that they would give employers "powerful incentives" to adopt quotas. Supporters of the bill argued that, contrary to Bush's claims, the bill would not have led employers to adopt quotas. For example, Benjamin Hooks, the then-executive director of the NAACP, said he was "at a loss" as to why Bush described the legislation as a quota bill. Congress attempted to override his veto on October 24, but their attempt failed in the Senate by one vote to achieve the two-thirds majority required.

References

External links
Text of the summary of the Civil Rights Act of 1990

1990 in American law
101st United States Congress
Civil Rights Acts
United States proposed federal civil rights legislation